Rosalba Estela Morales Del Águila (born 14 November 1998) is a Colombian weightlifter. She won the silver medal in the women's 55kg event at the 2022 World Weightlifting Championships held in Bogotá, Colombia. She won the gold medal in women's 55kg event at the 2022 South American Games held in Asunción, Paraguay.

Achievements

References

External links 
 

Living people
1998 births
Place of birth missing (living people)
Colombian female weightlifters
South American Games gold medalists for Colombia
South American Games medalists in weightlifting
Competitors at the 2022 South American Games
World Weightlifting Championships medalists
21st-century Colombian women